The 2014–15 Shakhtar Donetsk season was the 24th season in the club's history, they were the defending Ukrainian Premier League champions that season.

Squad

Out on Loan

Transfers

In

Out

Loans out

Released

Friendlies

Competitions

Overall

Super Cup

Premier League

Results summary

Results by round

Results

League table

Ukrainian Cup

Final

UEFA Champions League

Group stage

Knockout stage

Squad statistics

Appearances and goals

|-
|colspan="14"|Players away from the club on loan:

|-
|colspan="14"|Players who appeared for Shakhtar who left the club during the season:

|}

Goalscorers

Clean sheets

Disciplinary record

Notes

References

External links 
 

Shakhtar Donetsk season
FC Shakhtar Donetsk seasons
Shakhtar Donetsk